Hatem Ali Abu Khadra (born 1990) is a Jordanian footballer, of Palestinian origin, who plays as a striker.

References
 Abu Khadra Officially Transfers to Al-Ahli 
 Khadra is one of the few players who played for Al-Wehdat and Al-Faisaly together

External links
 

1990 births
Living people
Jordanian footballers
Jordan international footballers
Association football forwards
Jordanian people of Palestinian descent
Jordanian Pro League players
Al-Faisaly SC players
Al-Yarmouk FC (Jordan) players
Al-Wehdat SC players
Shabab Al-Aqaba Club players
That Ras Club players
Al-Baqa'a Club players
Sahab SC players
Al-Ahli SC (Amman) players
Jordanian expatriate footballers
Jordanian expatriate sportspeople in the State of Palestine
Expatriate footballers in the State of Palestine
Sportspeople from Amman